Ants Paju (10 September 1944 – 28 June 2011) was an Estonian politician, journalist, athlete, and engineer. He was a member of VIII Riigikogu.

Ants Paju was born in the village of Tamsi, Pajusi Rural Municipality, Viljandi County (now, in Põltsamaa Parish, Jõgeva County). In 1949, aged four, he was deported with his family to Siberia with his family by Soviet authorities. Following the death of Joseph Stalin and the Khrushchev Thaw, the family were permitted to return to Estonia in 1955. He graduated from secondary school in Põltsamaa in 1963, and from the Estonian Academy of Agriculture (now, the Estonian University of Life Sciences) in 1970, with a degree in forest engineering. In 1979, he graduated from the Leningrad Higher Party School with a degree in journalism.

He  began participating in sports in 1957. Under the guidance of Ahto Talving, he trained as a middle-distance running, later he trained mainly in shot put and discus. In 1970 he became the champion of track and field sports associations in discus and in 1972, shot put. In 1972, he won a silver medal at the Estonian Athletics Championships and a bronze medal in 1973. Paju competed on the Estonian team from 1972 until 1973.

As a journalist, he worked as the deputy editor of the Jõgeva district newspaper Punalipp and the editor-in-chief of the magazine Eesti Loodus.

From 2000 until 2001, Paju was the mayor of Jõgeva. In 2001, he was awarded the Order of the White Star, V Class. In 2003, he was awarded the Order of the National Coat of Arms, III Class.

Paju died in 2011, aged 66, and is buried in Põltsamaa cemetery. A memorial and bench created by Tauno Kangro to honour to Paju was unveiled in Sõpruse Park in Jõgeva in 2018. Paju had founded the park in 1973.

References

1944 births
2011 deaths
Estonian Greens politicians
Estonian Centre Party politicians
Isamaa politicians
Members of the Riigikogu, 1995–1999
Voters of the Estonian restoration of Independence
Mayors of places in Estonia
20th-century Estonian politicians
Estonian prisoners and detainees
Estonian discus throwers
Estonian shot putters
Estonian journalists
Estonian editors
Estonian magazine editors
Recipients of the Order of the White Star, 5th Class
Recipients of the Order of the National Coat of Arms, 3rd Class
Estonian University of Life Sciences alumni
People from Põltsamaa Parish
Eesti Loodus editors